Opomydas is a genus of mydas flies (insects in the family Mydidae). There are at least 3 described species in Opomydas.

Species
 Opomydas athamus (Sequy, 1928)
 Opomydas limbatus (Williston, 1886)
 Opomydas townsendi (Williston, 1898)

References

Further reading

External links

 Diptera.info

Mydidae
Asiloidea genera